Phrygionis auriferaria, the golden-winged palyas moth, is a species of geometrid moth in the family Geometridae. It is found in the Caribbean and North America.

The MONA or Hodges number for Phrygionis auriferaria is 6670.

References

Further reading

 
 
 

Ennominae